The men's freestyle 70 kilograms is a competition featured at the 2016 World Wrestling Championships, and was held in Budapest, Hungary on 11 December.

Results
Legend
F — Won by fall
R — Retired

Final

Top half

Bottom half

Repechage

References
Results Book, Page 16

Men's freestyle 70 kg